The Ambush near Tanuševci was an attack by Albanian rebels of the NLA, near the village of Tanuševci on March 4, 2001 during the Insurgency in Macedonia.

Ambush

Background 
On February 26 2001 fighting broke out in the village. By the 2nd of March 2001, 100 Albanian rebels had occupied Tanuševci and the forest around it.

Fighting 
Albanian insurgents planted landmines on a road leading to Tanuševci. At 7:30 AM an ARM vehicle hit the landmines, killing two soldiers. At 8 AM the rebels opened fire at army forces, killing one soldier.

Aftermath 
The European Union condemned the attack. Due to the ambush, Macedonia closed its border with Kosovo. Macedonian authorities sent around 3,000 to 4,000 men to tackle the rebels, but within days the rebellion spread around nearby villages. Around 500 residents of Tanuševci, mainly women and children, fled into Kosovo.

References 

History of North Macedonia
History of Kosovo